Tan Yen may refer to:
Tan-Yen, Iran
Tân Yên District, Vietnam